City of Akron v. Akron Center for Reproductive Health, 462 U.S. 416 (1983), was a case in which the United States Supreme Court affirmed its abortion rights jurisprudence. In an opinion by Justice Powell, the Court struck down several provisions of an Ohio abortion law, including portions found to be unconstitutionally vague.

Hospital requirement
One provision of the statute required abortions after the first trimester to be performed in a hospital. The Court found that to be unconstitutional. The state has a compelling interest in regulating abortion after the first trimester, but accepted medical practice does not recommend for all second-trimester abortions to be performed in a hospital. The regulation imposed an unnecessary burden that has the effect of infringing upon the constitutional right to an abortion.

Prohibition on unmarried minors
Another provision stated that a physician may not perform an abortion on an unmarried minor under 15 without obtaining either consent from one of her parents or a judicial bypass.
The Court likewise struck down the provision, as the law and the Ohio courts provided no suitable mechanism for a minor to gain a judicial bypass, as the relevant laws and courts concerning juveniles did not mention abortion or establish the authority to determine the maturity or emancipation of a minor.

Information requirements
The statute also stated that before performing an abortion, the physician must inform the patient of the status of the pregnancy, stage of fetal development, expected date of viability, health risks of abortion, and the availability of adoption agencies and childbirth resources. The Court found the provision to be unconstitutional, as the script, ostensibly provided to ensure informed consent, was found to be geared towards influencing the patient to decide against an abortion.

The state may not attempt to influence the patient's choice between abortion and childbirth. The Ohio regulation extends the state's interest in informed consent beyond permissible limits, interfering with the discretion of the physician and placing unreasonable obstacles in his path.
The requirement for doctors to tell patients that the fetus is "a human life from the moment of conception" also violates the provision in Roe v. Wade that "a State may not adopt one theory of when life begins to justify its regulation of abortions."
The detailed description of the fetus that doctors are required to provide is speculative.
The list of risks of abortion that the doctor is required to provide is "intended to suggest that abortion is a particularly dangerous procedure" and also overrides the physician's judgment, as he must tell his patient specific risks even if they do not apply to that patient.

24-hour waiting period
Another provision mandated a 24-hour waiting period after the patient signs a consent form. The Court struck the provision down, as no state interest is served by the imposition of an "arbitrary and inflexible" waiting period.

Disposal requirements
The final challenged provision required physicians to ensure that fetal remains are disposed of in a "humane and sanitary manner."  The majority deemed that to be unconstitutional, as criminal sanctions are imposed upon doctors who break the law, but "humane" was unconstitutionally vague and so a violation of due process.  Rather than strike down "humane" and preserve "sanitary," the Court struck down the entire provision.

Dissent
In her dissenting opinion, Sandra Day O'Connor, joined by Byron White and William Rehnquist, urged "the 'unduly burdensome' standard" from two prior cases, Maher v. Roe (1977) and Bellotti v. Baird (1979) to "be applied to the challenged regulations throughout the entire pregnancy without reference to the particular 'stage' of pregnancy involved." The "undue burden" test was later to gain acceptance by a plurality of the Court in Planned Parenthood v. Casey (1992), which replaced the earlier "strict scrutiny" standard of review of abortion regulations with the lesser "undue burden" standard, a standard which remained in effect until the ruling in Dobbs v. Jackson Women's Health Organization in 2022.

See also
List of United States Supreme Court cases, volume 462

References

External links

Overruled United States Supreme Court decisions
United States Supreme Court cases
United States Supreme Court cases of the Burger Court
United States abortion case law
United States privacy case law
Right to abortion under the United States Constitution
Right to privacy under the United States Constitution
1983 in United States case law
Void for vagueness case law
American Civil Liberties Union litigation
History of Akron, Ohio
Legal history of Ohio
History of women in Ohio